Rubí Elena Rodríguez Moreno is a Chilean mathematician in the department of mathematics and statistics at the University of La Frontera, a founder of the Iberoamerican Congress on Geometry, and the former president of the Chilean Mathematical Society. Her research specialties include complex geometry, Fuchsian groups, Riemann surfaces, and abelian varieties.

Education
She completed her Ph.D. in 1981 at Columbia University; her dissertation, On Schottky-Type Groups with Applications to Riemann Surfaces with Nodes, was supervised by Lipman Bers.

Career
Rodríguez worked for the University of Santiago, Chile, but was dismissed in 1985, during the regime of Augusto Pinochet, for unstated but likely-political reasons. After many colleagues appealed the decision, she was hired by the Federico Santa María Technical University.

She was president of the Chilean Mathematical Society from 2006 to 2010.

Books
Rodríguez is the co-author of the book Complex Analysis: In the Spirit of Lipman Bers (Graduate Texts in Mathematics, 2007, 2nd ed., 2013, with Irwin Kra and Jane Piore Gilman). She is the co-editor of Lipman Bers, a Life in Mathematics (American Mathematical Society, 2015, with Linda Keen and Irwin Kra).

References

Year of birth missing (living people)
Living people
Columbia University alumni
University of La Frontera
20th-century Chilean mathematicians
Women mathematicians
21st-century Chilean mathematicians